Jamalul Alam II (1889 – September 11, 1924) was the 26th Sultan of Brunei from 10 May 1906 until his death in 1924.

Early life 
Born in 1889 at Istana Kampong Ayer, Bandar Brunei, he was the eldest surviving son of Sultan Hashim Jalilul Alam Aqamaddin. Before he became sultan, he was known as Pengiran Muda Bongsu Muhammad Jamalul Alam.

Reign (1906-1924) 
He ascended to the throne at the age of 17 after the death of his father in May 1906. It is notable that he also became the first Sultan of Brunei to speak English. The responsibility of the Sultan was in the hands of the Majlis Pemangku Raja (Council of Regency). During his reign, he aimed to encourage new developments in agriculture, medicine, and education. Jamalul Alam oversaw several major events such as the first discovery of crude oil was first discovered in the country but not before major oil strikes were made in Seria in 1927. Moreover, his reign was in charge of Brunei during its most impoverished state.

In 1909, he relocated his residence on land, and later encouraged Chinese to settle in Brunei for commercial skills. It was only on 15 May 1918 that he was crowned as sultan. Jamalul Alam was convinced by the bendahara (vizier) to signed a petition to change 5 points to the 1905 treaty. It was also during his reign that Islamic Law was officially introduced in the country. This was known as Mohammedan Laws Enactment. It was introduced in 1912, replacing the Kanun Brunei. Then in 1913, the Marriage and Divorce Act was introduced.

With the introduction of the Residential System in Brunei in 1906, all the executive power, except in matters of religion and tradition, was transferred from the Sultan to the Resident. It was only until 1918, he was coronated as Sultan of Brunei. In 1922, he moved from Istana Kampong Ayer to Istana Majlis. That same year, a band of traditional musicians was sent to Singapore as attendants to the Sultan.

He also encouraged learning Islam and built a mosque despite the country's lack of revenue. During World War II, the mosque was destroyed due to the intense shelling and fighting within Brunei Town.

Death 
An outbreak of malaria claimed his life as well as three members of his family on 11 September 1924, aged 35. He was succeeded by his eldest son, Pengiran Muda Besar Ahmad Tajuddin. He was buried at the Royal Mausoleum at Jalan Tutong.

Personal life

Marriage 
Jamalul Alam was married to Tengah and Siti Fatimah.

Issue 
He had a total of 10 children whom were;
 Princess Besar (1902–1993)
 Prince Bongsu (1908–1910)
 Princess Tengah (1910–1969)
 Princess Damit (born 1911)
 Sultan Ahmad Tajuddin (1913–1950)
 Sultan Omar Ali Saifuddien III (1914–1986)
 Prince Anum (died 1924)
 Prince Laila Gambar (died 1924)
 Prince Besar Bagol (died 1945)
 Princess Tinggal

Legacy

 Muhammad Jamalul Alam Mosque, named after him and the early Sultan Muhammad Jamalul Alam I.
 Sultan Muhammad Jamalul Alam Middle School (SMJA), formerly Sultan Muhammad Jamalul Alam Malay Middle School.

Honours
 Knight Commander of the Order of St. Michael and St. George (KCMG) – Sir 1920

External links
 Sultan-Sultan Brunei

References

1889 births
1924 deaths
Honorary Knights Commander of the Order of St Michael and St George
20th-century Sultans of Brunei
Deaths from malaria
Infectious disease deaths in Brunei